William Martin is an American author of historical novels, a native of Boston, MA.

Biography 
William Martin grew up in West Roxbury and Roslindale, Massachusetts, and graduated from Harvard University in 1972 where he majored in English. He worked as an historical research assistant and directed theater in the evening.

He went into construction to raise money to move to Hollywood and then studied motion pictures at the University of Southern California.

Martin wrote two screenplays in an effort to get into the writing business. Producers and his agent suggested that, to best take advantage of his writing style, Martin should write a novel. Based on the outline of his first novel, Martin obtained a $7,500 publishing deal. The book, Back Bay, was published in 1979 and reached the New York Times bestseller list.

William Martin has continued to write historical novels and currently lives in Weston, Massachusetts (near Boston) with his wife, two sons and a daughter.

Bibliography

Peter Fallon series 
Back Bay (1979)
Harvard Yard (2003), Grand Central Publishing (December 1, 2004), 
The Lost Constitution (2007), Forge Books (June 2008), 
City of Dreams (2010), Forge Books (May 11, 2010), 
The Lincoln Letter (2012), Forge Books, 
Bound for Gold (2019), Forge Books,

Other novels 
Nerve Endings (1984)
The Rising of the Moon (1987)
Cape Cod (1991)
Annapolis (1996)
Citizen Washington (1999)
December '41 (2022)

Awards 
 2005 New England Book Award

External links
Macmillan Books: Author: William Martin
williammartinbooks.com
"The Lost Constitution" on books.google.com
William Martin books at amazon.com
Official Facebook fan page of author William Martin

20th-century American novelists
21st-century American novelists
American male novelists
Writers from Boston
Harvard University alumni
University of California, Berkeley alumni
Living people
20th-century American male writers
21st-century American male writers
Novelists from Massachusetts
Year of birth missing (living people)
People from Roslindale
People from Weston, Massachusetts
People from West Roxbury, Boston